The Kolari railway is the northernmost railway in Finland and goes between Tornio and Kolari. The railway is not electrified and it has Finnish broad gauge. It connects to the Oulu–Tornio railway in Tornio.

It was built in 1928 the first  Tornio–Kaulinranta and in 1967 the remaining  to Kolari. There are two mine railways, both , north of Kolari to the mines of Rautuvaara and Äkäsjokisuu. These mines were the primary reason to extend the railway north of Kaulinranta. 

There were in 2009-2010 short term plans to extend the railway  from Äkäsjokisuu to the new Tapuli mine in Sweden, but the mining company decided to use Narvik as shipping port instead. There are also suggestions on extending it to Skibotn or Tromsø in Norway.

References

External links

Railway lines in Finland
5 ft gauge railways in Finland